Andrea Blas Martinez (born 14 February 1992 in Zaragoza) is a Spanish female water polo player. At the 2012 Summer Olympics, she competed for the Spain women's national water polo team in the women's event, where they won the silver medal. She is 5 ft 8 inches tall.

See also
 List of Olympic medalists in water polo (women)
 List of world champions in women's water polo
 List of World Aquatics Championships medalists in water polo

References

External links
 

1992 births
Living people
Sportspeople from Zaragoza
Spanish female water polo players
Water polo centre forwards
Water polo players at the 2012 Summer Olympics
Medalists at the 2012 Summer Olympics
Olympic silver medalists for Spain in water polo
World Aquatics Championships medalists in water polo
21st-century Spanish women